A hybrid (annular/total) solar eclipse occurred on Saturday, February 11, 1804 (Gregorian Calendar). A solar eclipse occurs when the Moon passes between Earth and the Sun, thereby totally or partly obscuring the image of the Sun for a viewer on Earth. An hybrid solar eclipse shifts between a total and annular eclipse. At certain points on the surface of Earth it appears as a total eclipse, whereas at other points it appears as annular. Hybrid eclipses are comparatively rare.
This eclipse is a hybrid event, a narrow total eclipse, and beginning and ending as an annular eclipse. The greatest eclipse was in the Sahara Desert in modern-day Algeria at 26.7 N, 4.5 W at 11:16:33 UTC, in that portion it shown as a total eclipse, the remainder was as an annular.

Description
The eclipse was visible in the northeast of Brazil, most of Africa and Europe.

The umbral portion included Portuguese Cape Verde (now independent) with the island of Santo Antão, the Arguin region (now part of Mauritania), the Moorish lands, the Regency of Algiers (then under Ottoman suzerainty, now Algeria), Sardinia, Italy with southern Tuscany, Umbria and modern Emilia-Romagna, Slovenia (then called Carniola), parts of the Venetian Republic, some of the lands were ruled by Napoleon I, the Habsburg lands of Austria, Hungary (one part including modern day Slovakia), Moravia (now part of the Czech Republic), contemporary Poland and the west of the Russian Empire between Moscow and Saint Petersburg.

The eclipse was 50% obscuration near a part of Brazil at Ceará, the Kingdom of Benin, el Alamein, the Caucasus and off the west shores of Iceland.

Areas that were in the edge of the eclipse included Bahía, Cabinda (sometimes as Kabinda), the lower Congo, Bahrain, the Qatar Peninsula and Shiraz.

See also 
 List of solar eclipses in the 19th century

References

External links 
 Google interactive maps
 Solar eclipse data

1804 02 11
Solar eclipse of 02 11
1804 02 11
February 1804 events